Jón Gnarr (born 2 January 1967) is an Icelandic actor, comedian, and politician who served as the Mayor of Reykjavík from 2010 to 2014.

Born Jón Gunnar Kristinsson, Jón legally changed his middle name in 2005 to the way his mother pronounced it when he was a boy. He prefers to be addressed as Jón Gnarr as he does not wish to carry his father's name. Under national law overseen by the Icelandic Naming Committee, he had not been allowed to legally drop "Kristinsson" from his name as seen on his passport until 2015. Gnarr was only recognized as a surname by the courts in 2018.

Gnarr was a well-known comedian and actor starting in the 1990s, including teaming with Sigurjón Kjartansson as the duo Tvíhöfði on radio and television. In 2009, he formed the Best Party, a political party that began as political satire but quickly turned into a real political player due to its electoral successes, which were perceived to be a reaction to the 2008–2011 Icelandic financial crisis.

Early years
Gnarr was misdiagnosed with severe intellectual disability as a child and was treated between the ages of five and seven at the children's psychiatry ward at the State Hospital at Dalbraut, Reykjavík. He has dyslexia and had learning difficulties. Jón Gnarr recounts these experiences in his book The Indian, an autobiographical account of his childhood.

Gnarr was known as Jónsi Punk as a teenager and played bass in a punk band called Nefrennsli ("Runny Nose"). While attending a number of high schools, he didn't complete the university entrance exam, Stúdentspróf. As a young man, he held jobs with car maker Volvo and drove a taxi in Reykjavík. During the 1980s, he and his future wife, Jóhanna "Jóga" Jóhannsdóttir, became acquainted with the members of the Reykjavík-based alternative rock band the Sugarcubes, including Björk Guðmundsdóttir and Einar Örn Benediktsson. Björk remained a close friend to Jóhanna, writing the song "Jóga" from her 1997 album Homogenic about her.

Education
Jón Gnarr has an MFA degree in performing arts from the Iceland University of the Arts. His graduation work was his own performance of the ancient Icelandic poem Völuspá from the Poetic Edda

Performance career
In 1994, Gnarr teamed up with Sigurjón Kjartansson to form the radio duo Tvíhöfði. In 1997, he joined TV station Stöð 2 where he wrote and starred in several seasons of the Icelandic comedy show Fóstbræður. His best known movies are The Icelandic Dream and A Man like Me. His stand-up comedy show Ég var einu sinni nörd (I Used To Be a Nerd) is autobiographical. In 2004 he wrote, starred and produced a short film, The Man on the Back.

He worked as a creative writer and actor at the Icelandic advertising agency EnnEmm, producing several popular TV ads. He played Georg Bjarnfreðarson on the television series Næturvaktin (Night Shift), Dagvaktin (Day Shift) and Fangavaktin (Prison Shift). He was also a co-writer in the series, which introduced a number of new actors. In 2009, he starred in the feature film Bjarnfreðarson, which endeared him even further to the Icelandic public. Gnarr is a member of Félag íslenskra leikara (Icelandic Actors Guild) and Félag leikskálda og handritshöfunda (Playwrights and Screenwriters Guild).

Entry into politics
In late 2009, Gnarr founded the Best Party with a number of other people who had no background in politics, including Einar. The Best Party, which is a satirical political party that parodies Icelandic politics and aims to make the life of the citizens more fun, managed a plurality in the 2010 municipal elections in Reykjavík, with the party gaining six out of 15 seats on the Reykjavík City Council (34.7 percent of the vote). Einar, who was second on the party's list behind Gnarr, won one of the seats on the city council.

Gnarr ended up defeating the centre-right Independence Party-led municipal government of Hanna Birna Kristjánsdóttir, which came as "a shock" to Icelandic Prime Minister Jóhanna Sigurðardóttir. Gnarr's victory is widely seen as a backlash against establishment politicians in the wake of the Icelandic financial crisis, i.e 2008 banking collapse.

His political platform included promises of "free towels in all swimming pools, a polar bear for the Reykjavík zoo, all kinds of things for weaklings, Disneyland in the Vatnsmýri area, a 'drug-free' Althing by 2020, sustainable transparency, tollbooths on the border with Seltjarnarnes, to do away with all debt, free access to Hljómskálagarðurinn (orchestral rotunda park)."

Both before and after being elected, Gnarr announced that he would not go in for a coalition government with anyone that had not watched the HBO series The Wire. He is an avid watcher of the series, and stated his favourite character is Omar. Ultimately, his Best Party entered into a coalition with the social-democratic Social Democratic Alliance (Samfylkingin) as its junior partner to govern Reykjavík.

As Reykjavík mayor

After Gnarr became mayor of Reykjavík, it was jokingly proposed that the city be nicknamed Gnarrenburg, the title of an earlier television talk show featuring Gnarr. As mayor, he appeared at the 2010 Gay Pride parade as a drag queen, posted a video holiday greeting wearing a Darth Vader mask and a Santa Claus cap, and suggested a merger with neighboring municipality Kópavogur. Gnarr protested about the Chinese government's treatment of human rights activist Liu Xiaobo, before the announcement of Liu's award for the 2010 Nobel Peace Prize. He has also stated that he believes the importance of the European Union is highly over-rated. His government also included the granting of long-awaited permission for the construction of Iceland's first purpose-built mosque.

On 30 October 2013, Gnarr announced that he would not seek a second term in office when his first term expired in June 2014.

After leaving office
Since leaving office, Gnarr has campaigned for Iceland to abandon its laws regarding traditional Icelandic names, viewing it as discriminatory, e.g. that only some family names are allowed and Gnarr not an approved one. Gnarr also authored a book entitled Gnarr!: How I Became the Mayor of a Large City in Iceland and Changed the World. In January 2015 Gnarr joined the Center for Energy and Environmental Research in the Human Sciences (CENHS) at Rice University as their first writer in residence.

After the incumbent President of Iceland, Ólafur Ragnar Grímsson, announced on 1 January 2016 that he would not run in the upcoming presidential election, it was speculated that Gnarr would put forward his candidacy. On 15 January 2016, Gnarr announced he would not be running for office "for the time being", but that he could "think of doing it later", and that he was more interested in working more in Icelandic television.

Prior to the 2017 parliamentary election, Gnarr joined the Social Democratic Alliance as the SDA's campaign manager.

Personal life and family
Jón Gnarr is married to Jóhanna Jóhannsdóttir, a close friend of the singer Björk, with whom he has five children,
one of which is Margret Gnarr, a fitness competitor.

Awards and recognitions
 Edda Award
 2010 Bjarnfreðarson (Mr Bjarnfredarson) Best Actor of the Year (Winner)
 2010 Fangavaktin (The Prisoners Shift) Best Actor of the Year (Winner)
 2010 Bjarnfreðarson (Mr Bjarnfredarson) Best Film of the Year (Winner) 
 2010 Bjarnfreðarson (Mr Bjarnfredarson) Screenplay of the Year (Winner)
 2010 Fangavaktin (The Prisoners Shift) TV Drama/Comedy of the Year (Winner)
 2008 Dagvaktin (The Day Shift) Screenplay of the Year (Nomination)
 2008 Dagvaktin (The Day Shift) TV Drama/Comedy of the Year (Winner)
 2007 Næturvaktin (The Night Shift) TV Drama/Comedy of the Year (Winner)
 2004 Með mann á bakinu (The Man on the Back) Screenplay of the Year (Winner)
 2001 Fóstbræður (Foster Brothers) Best Actor of the Year (Winner)
 2000 Íslenski draumurinn (The Icelandic Dream) Supporting Actor of the Year (Nomination)
 2010 Visir.is, Person of the Year Award
 2013 Honorary member of Samtökin '78, The National Queer Organization of Iceland
 2013 Siðmennt, Humanist of the Year Award
 2014 LennonOno Grant for Peace Award

See also
 Gnarr, a 2010 Icelandic documentary film about Gnarr's mayoral campaign
 Where to Invade Next

Notes

References

External links

 

1967 births
Jon Gnarr
Living people
Jon Gnarr
Jon Gnarr
Jon Gnarr
Jon Gnarr
Jon Gnarr
Jon Gnarr
Jon Gnarr
Jon Gnarr
Jon Gnarr
Jon Gnarr
Jon Gnarr
Actors with dyslexia
Politicians with dyslexia